Prodontorhabditis is a genus of nematodes belonging to the family Rhabditidae.

The species of this genus are found in Europe and Central America.

Species:

Prodontorhabditis anthobia 
Prodontorhabditis gracilis 
Prodontorhabditis grandistoma 
Prodontorhabditis parvus 
Prodontorhabditis pluvialis 
Prodontorhabditis robustus 
Prodontorhabditis wirthi

References

Nematodes